Fillmore is an unincorporated community in Lee County, Kentucky, United States. Its post office closed in 1996. Census information for Fillmore is under the St. Helens district.

References

Unincorporated communities in Lee County, Kentucky
Unincorporated communities in Kentucky